Senator Boucher may refer to:

Rick Boucher (born 1946), Virginia State Senate
Toni Boucher (born 1949), Connecticut State Senate